Harry Hoey (1902–1966) was an Australian rugby league footballer who played in the 1920s.

Graded from the Hurstville United junior club in 1925,  Harry Hoey went on play 4 seasons of first grade with the St. George club, retiring in 1930. He left Sydney to become a successful farmer at Mummulgum, near Casino, New South Wales. Harry Hoey was a member of the Dragons team that played in the infamous game against the Balmain Tigers on 11 August 1928 at Earl Park, Arncliffe.

Hoey died on 9 May 1966 aged 63.

References

St. George Dragons players
1902 births
1966 deaths
Australian rugby league players
Rugby league locks
Rugby league props